Cary Historic District is a national historic district located at Cary, Wake County, North Carolina.  The district encompasses 39 contributing buildings in a predominantly residential section of Cary.  The district developed between about 1890 and 1945, and includes notable examples of Queen Anne and Bungalow / American Craftsman style architecture.  Notable buildings include the former Cary High School (Later Cary Elementary School at application, now Cary Arts Center) built in 1939 by the Works Progress Administration, Esther Ivey House (c. 1890), Captain Harrison P. Guess House (1830s, c. 1900), and Dr. John P. Hunter House (c. 1925).

It was listed on the National Register of Historic Places in 2001.

References

Works Progress Administration in North Carolina
Historic districts on the National Register of Historic Places in North Carolina
Queen Anne architecture in North Carolina
Buildings and structures in Wake County, North Carolina
National Register of Historic Places in Wake County, North Carolina